Rule 48, also known as Exemptive Relief — Extreme Market Volatility Condition, is a mechanism used by the New York Stock Exchange to ease market opening while volatility is high. It may have the effect of pre-empting trading at disrupted prices, as the designated market makers do not have to disseminate price indications prior to the opening bell.

History
Rule 48 was approved by the U.S. Securities and Exchange Commission on December 6, 2007. It was invoked 77 times from 2008 to September 2015, but only used a few times. For example, it was used on January 22, 2008 and May 20, 2010, as well as September 1, 2015.

References

New York Stock Exchange